Minuscule 375 (in the Gregory-Aland numbering), ε 112 (Soden), is a Greek minuscule manuscript of the New Testament, on parchment. Palaeographically it has been assigned to the 11th century. 
It contains marginalia.

Description 

The codex contains the text of the four Gospels on 173 parchment leaves. It is written in two columns per page, in 26 lines per page.

There is also a division according to the smaller Ammonian Sections (in Mark 233 Sections, the last in 16:8), with references to the Eusebian Canons (written below Ammonian Section numbers).

Text 

The Greek text of the codex is a representative of the Byzantine text-type. Hermann von Soden classified it to the textual family Kx. Aland placed it in Category V.

According to the Claremont Profile Method it represents textual family Kx in Luke 1, Luke 10, and Luke 20. It belongs also to the cluster 352.

History 

The manuscript once belonged to John Metelli. The manuscript was added to the list of New Testament manuscripts by Scholz (1794–1852).
C. R. Gregory saw it in 1886.

The manuscript is currently housed at the Vatican Library (Vat. gr. 1533) in Rome.

See also 

 List of New Testament minuscules
 Biblical manuscript
 Textual criticism

References

Further reading 

 

Greek New Testament minuscules
11th-century biblical manuscripts
Manuscripts of the Vatican Library